The Royal Lao Navy (– MRL) was the naval component of the Royal Lao Armed Forces (FAR), the official military of the Royal Lao Government and the Kingdom of Laos during the Laotian Civil War between 1960 and 1975.

History

The Laotian Navy was first formed on January 28, 1955 as the "naval" wing of the Laotian National Army (ANL) and designated the River Flotilla. A predominantly riverine force since Laos is a land-locked country, the ANL River Flotilla was provided at the time with nineteen U.S.-built river patrol boats. The new Laotian Navy was originally trained and staffed by French Officers and senior Petty Officers seconded from the naval forces component of the French Far East Expeditionary Corps (CEFEO), although a small number of selected Laotian naval officer candidate students ( – EOMs) were also sent to France, in order to attend advanced Officer and Petty Officer courses at the French Naval Academy in Brest.

In July 1959 the ANL River Flotilla was re-designated Laotian Navy and became an independent branch, now part of the newly created Laotian Armed Forces ( – FAL), renamed Royal Lao Armed Forces ( – FAR) in September 1961.

The MRL in the Laotian civil war 1960-1975

Like the ANL, the fledgling Laotian Navy soon found itself involved in the political turmoil that engulfed the Kingdom of Laos in the early 1960s. During Major general Phoumi Nosavan November 1960 counter-coup against Captain Kong Le's rebel Neutralist airborne units, four pro-Neutralist Laotian Navy river gunboats blocked the Mekong River at Ban Sot in an effort to halt the advance northwards from Savannakhet of Maj. Gen. Nosavan's rebel troops towards Vientiane. Other Laotian Naval units however, supported the coup by transporting up the Mekong in landing crafts from Savannakhet Lieutenant colonel Siho Lamphouthacoul and his Directorate of National Coordination (DNC) elite para-commando regiment, the 1st Special Mobile Group ( – GMS 1), on 21 November to join the Battle of Vientiane.

Structure
The MRL, along with the Royal Lao Air Force (RLAF) and the Royal Lao Army (RLA), was placed under the control of the Ministry of Defence in Vientiane; its administrative headquarters was allocated at Vientiane's military harbour, whose facilities also housed the main repair yard, the Fleet Command and the Independent Directorate of Laotian River Transports ( – RATFL), which handled military logistics and monotorized commercial shipping along the Mekong river.

Fleet organization
By April 1975 Royal Lao Navy strength peaked at 500 Ratings and enlisted men led by Commander Tiao Sinthanavong Kindavong, who manned a single river flotilla totalling 42 light vessels, divided since the mid-1950s into a patrol squadron ( – EFHM) and a squadron-sized transport section ( – STFL).
Throughout its existence, the MRL received technical and training assistance mainly from France, Thailand and the United States, with the latter country providing river patrol boats and transportation craft to equip their patrol and transport squadrons respectively.
Most of the Laotian Navy river assets were stationed permanently at Vientiane Naval Base, with secondary riverine stations set along the Mekong at Luang Prabang, Pak Lay, Thakhek, Savannakhet, Paksé and Khong Island. Besides its tiny surface fleet, the MRL was also unique in its genre for not maintaining a permanent Naval Infantry branch or even specialist combat diver/Marine Commando units.

List of Laotian Navy commanders
Commander Tiao Sinthanavong Kindavong (? - 1975)

Equipment

Escort and combat patrol craft
Six Cabin-type patrol boats
Two Chris-Craft patrol boats
Twelve 11m patrol boats
Twenty PBR Mk 1 and 2 "Bibber" patrol boats

Troop transport, amphibious assault, and logistical operations craft
Sixteen LCM-8 Landing Craft Utility (LCU)

MRL uniforms and insignia
The Laotian Navy owed its origin and traditions to the French Far East Naval Forces ( – FMEO) of the First Indochina War, and even after the United States took the role as the main foreign sponsor for the Royal Laotian Armed Forces at the beginning of the 1960s, French military influence was still perceptible in their uniforms and insignia.

Service dress and field uniforms
Upon its formation at the mid-1950s, most Laotian Navy personnel received the standard French Navy's tropical working and service dress, consisting of a light khaki cotton shirt and pants. The French Navy's M1948 shirt featured a six-buttoned front and two pleated breast pockets closed by pointed flaps, was provided with shoulder straps and had long sleeves with buttoned cuffs. It was worn with matching khaki M1945/52 slacks, which featured two pleats at the front hips, side slashed pockets and an internal pocket at the back, on the right side.
The French Army's tropical light khaki cotton shirt and pants, modelled after the WWII US Army tropical "Chino" working dress was also issued. While the cut of the matching khaki trousers was virtually identical to the Navy pattern, the shirt had two patch breast pockets closed by clip-cornered straight flaps and shoulder straps.
In alternative, the short-sleeved M1946 – whose cut was almost identical to the M1948 variant – and the "Chino"-style M1949 khaki shirts could be worn with the matching M1946 khaki shorts in hot weather.

Reflecting the increasing American influence, a new set of distinctive uniforms was introduced for the MRL in the early 1960s. Laotian naval senior officers and petty officers adopted a Navy Blue overseas service uniform, which consisted of a double-breasted reefer jacket with open collar and lapels, and featuring two internal skirt pockets with external flaps. The jacket had a double row of six gilt metal buttons bearing the Royal Lao Armed Forces (FAR) wreathed "Vishnu" trident, and was worn with a white shirt and black tie, completed with matching blue trousers. Enlisted personnel also received a Navy Blue service uniform or Sailor suit, consisting of a Navy jumper (or pullover shirt) and trousers flared as "bell bottoms"; the jumper was worn with a black silk neckerchief rolled diagonally under the collar, with the ends tied in a square knot in the center of the chest.
For formal occasions, Laotian Navy officers retained the earlier ANL white summer cotton full dress, which consisted of a French-style eight-buttoned tunic with a standing collar and two built-in side pockets closed by straight flaps, worn with matching white slacks. The tunic's front fly was secured by gilt metal buttons initially bearing the ANL Airavata crest, replaced after 1959-60 by a FAR wreathed "Vishnu" trident motif.

On active service, Laotian Navy sailors and Ratings initially wore French all-arms M1947 drab green fatigues but in the 1960s and early 1970s, MRL personnel began to wear US-supplied OG 107 jungle fatigues.  Thai and South Vietnamese versions, as well as Laotian-made copies were also worn.  All these variants of the OG-107 fatigues often featured modifications to the original design such as shirts with shoulder straps and pockets closed by dual-buttoned straight flaps or pen pockets added on the left sleeve above the elbow, an affection common to all Laotian, South Vietnamese and Cambodian military officers, and additional side "cargo" pockets on the trousers. Olive green US M-1951 field jackets were also issued to all-ranks.

Headgear

Laotian Navy Officers and Petty Officers initially received a service peaked cap copied after the French M1927 pattern in both light khaki and white summer top versions with a black lacquered leather peak and gold cord chinstrap, to wear with the khaki working dress and the white high-collared full dress uniforms, respectively, and later with the Navy Blue overseas service uniform.  The peaked caps were worn with the standard gilt metal ANL cap device, a wreathed Airavata crest bearing the Laotian Royal Arms – a three-headed white elephant standing on a pedestal and surmounted by a pointed parasol – set on a black teardrop-shaped background patch.  After September 1961, the MRL replaced the old ANL crest with the standard gilt metal FAR wreathed "Vishnu" trident cap badge. French M1946 and M1957 light khaki sidecaps ( and ) were also worn by all-ranks. An American-style "Dixie cup" white hat was worn with the Navy Blue service uniform by enlisted ranks.

Laotian Navy personnel frequently wore in the field a mixture of French M1946 "Gourka" light khaki tropical berets, baseball cap-style khaki cotton field caps, and French M1949 bush hats in Khaki or OG cotton cloth.  During the 1960s and early 1970s, a wide range of OG "Boonie hats" and baseball caps from the US, South Vietnam and Thailand were adopted by MRL officers and enlisted men.

The steel helmet models worn by Laotian Navy vessel crews in the mid-1950s were the WWII-vintage US M-1 or the newer French M1951 NATO models, standard issue in the ANL.  In the later 1960s, the MRL standardized on the M-1 1964 model provided with the US Army Mitchell "Clouds" camouflage pattern cover (usually removed on the field), though many boat crewmen retained the older US and French steel helmets throughout the war.

Footwear
Brown low laced leather shoes were prescribed to wear with the Laotian Navy khaki service/work uniform for all-ranks and white ones with the earlier ANL white cotton full dress for formal occasions, whilst black shoes were worn with the MRL Navy Blue overseas service uniforms.
On the field, Laotian seamen initially wore brown leather US M-1943 Combat Service Boots, French M1953 brown leather "Rangers" (French: Rangers modéle 1953) and French M1917 brown leather hobnailed ankle boots (French: Brodequins modéle 1917), or French canvas-and-rubber Pataugas tropical boots, and sandals while in garrison; after 1960, the MRL adopted as regulation footwear black leather combat boots – the early US Army M-1962 "McNamara" model and the later M-1967, together with limited quantities of US Jungle boots, and local copies of the South Vietnamese Bata tropical boots.

Navy ranks
Initially, the Laotian Navy wore the same rank insignia as their French and ANL counterparts, whose sequence followed closely the French Navy pattern defined by the 1956 regulations. Junior officers and petty officers' ranks were worn on black removable shoulder boards or shoulder strap slides similar to the Army pattern, with the addition of a fouled anchor on the inner end.  NCOs and enlisted men wore metal or cloth chevrons on both upper sleeves or pinned to the chest.

In 1959 the Royal Lao Army (RLA) adopted a new distinctively Laotian-designed system of military ranks, which became in September 1961 the standard rank chart for all branches of service of the newly created Royal Lao Armed Forces. Under the new regulations, MRL officers were now entitled to wear on their service or dress uniforms stiffened red shoulder boards edged with gold braid identical to the standard RLA pattern. Junior officers added an appropriate number of five-pointed gold stars to their boards whilst petty officers' wore chevrons on the upper sleeve or diagonal bars on the lower sleeve. Enlisted men wore no insignia.

In the field, Laotian naval officers had their shoulder boards initially replaced by either shoulder strap slides or a single chest tab buttoned or pinned to the shirt's front fly following French Army practice.  By the late 1960s the MRL adopted the same American-style system as their RLA counterparts, in which metal pin-on or embroidered cloth rank insignia – either in yellow-on-green full-colour or black-on-green subdued form – were worn on the right collar.

Sip – Able seaman (no insignia)
Phakhian nairüa trï – Petty officer 2nd class (two white chevrons pointed up on upper sleeve)
Phakhian naïrüa thõ – Chief petty officer (three white diagonal bars on lower sleeve)
Phakhian naïrüa ëk – Master chief petty officer (three yellow diagonal bars on lower sleeve)
Rüa trï – Ensign (one five-pointed gold star)
Rüa thõ – Lieutenant junior grade (two five-pointed gold stars)
Rüa ëk – Lieutenant (three five-pointed gold stars)
Phãvã tri – Lieutenant commander (one five-pointed star inserted on a gold disc)
Phãvã thõ – Commander (two five-pointed stars, one inserted on a gold disc)

Branch and unit insignia
There were no arm-of-service designations as such in the Royal Lao Navy, although when wearing Khaki service dress or US OG jungle fatigues, naval personnel skills and trades were identified by collar badges, in either metal pin-on or cloth embroidered versions.  These were worn on the left collar only by ratings and on both collars by enlisted ranks as per in the RLA.

See also
 Brownwater Navy
 Khmer National Navy
 Laotian Civil War
 Mobile Riverine Force
 Republic of Vietnam Navy
 Vietnam War
 Weapons of the Laotian Civil War

Notes

References

Andrea Matles Savada (ed.), Laos: a country study (3rd ed.), Federal Research Division, Library of Congress, Washington, D.C. 1995. , OCLC 32394600. – 
 Kenneth Conboy and Don Greer, War in Laos 1954-1975, Carrollton, TX: Squadron/Signal Publications, 1994. , 0897473159
 Kenneth Conboy and Simon McCouaig, The War in Laos 1960-75, Men-at-arms series 217, Osprey Publishing Ltd, London 1989. 
 Kenneth Conboy with James Morrison, Shadow War: The CIA's Secret War in Laos, Boulder CO: Paladin Press, 1995. , 1581605358
 Maj. Gen. Oudone Sananikone, The Royal Lao Army and U.S. Army advice and support, Indochina monographs series, United States Army Center of Military History, Washington D.C. 1981. – 
 Timothy Castle, At War in the Shadow of Vietnam: United States Military Aid to the Royal Lao Government, 1955–1975, Columbia University Press, 1993.

Secondary sources

 Denis Lassus, Les marques de grade de l'armée française, 1945-1990 (1er partie-introduction), in Armes Militaria Magazine n.º 159, October 1998.  (in French)
 Denis Lassus, Les marques de grade de l'armée française, 1945-1990 (2e partie-les differents types de galons), in Armes Militaria Magazine n.º 161, December 1998.  (in French)
Gordon L. Rottman and Hugh Johnson, Vietnam Riverine Craft 1962-75, New Vanguard series 128, Osprey Publishing Ltd, Oxford 2006. 
 Paul Gaujac, Officiers et soldats de l'armée française d'après le TTA 148 (1943-1956), Histoire & Collections, Paris 2011.  (in French)

External links
Country Study - Kingdom of Laos
Laos Lao People's Navy
Royal Lao Armed Forces and Police heraldry
Royal Lao Navy rank insignia
SIPRI Arms Transfers Database
http://www.warboats.org/vietnamboats.htm

Royal Lao Armed Forces
Military units and formations established in 1955
Military units and formations disestablished in 1975
Disbanded navies
Riverine warfare
1955 establishments in Laos
1975 disestablishments in Laos